Sara Arjun (born ) is an Indian child actress who mainly  appears in Tamil and Hindi  films and commercials. Sara had appeared in a series of commercials and a short Hindi film before the age of six. In 2010, she was signed on to portray a lead role in A. L. Vijay's Tamil drama film Deiva Thirumagal, portraying the role of a six-year-old whose father was a mentally challenged adult with the mental capability of a six-year-old. The film opened to critical and commercial acclaim, with Sara's performance receiving praise from film critics. She has since worked in many Indian films, mainly in Tamil and Hindi as well as Telugu and Malayalam, winning positive reviews for her portrayals, particularly for her role in Vijay's Saivam (2014).

Career
Sara was one and a half years old when she shot for her first commercial after she was spotted at a mall with her parents and subsequently, Sara has appeared in a hundred ad films for brands including McDonald's. Sara did a commercial for director Vijay when she was two but he then lost touch with Sara's family, before he met them and cast Sara in his drama film, Deiva Thirumagal, following a visit to Mumbai. Her parents helped Sara learn the Tamil dialogues for the film by asking their Tamil friend, Maheswari, to assist them. The film's crew later remarked that Sara had also learned Vikram's dialogues in the film and tried to help him during the shoot. Upon release, the film became a critical and commercial success with Sara's performance of Nila becoming unanimously praised by film critics. The critic from Behindwoods.com claimed that it was Sara "who steals the show next only to Vikram in her angelic looks and performance" and added that "there is a serene look about her which warrants accolades". Similarly another critic cites that "Sara as Nila almost steals the show as Vikram's daughter", whilst the reviewers from CNN-IBN mentioned that Sara is "charm personified and she handles her role in an amazing manner". Her father claimed that Sara was unfazed by the publicity and once in her hotel room, she returned to her daily routine of "asking for her eraser, sharpener and colour pencils". During the period, she also completed a part in Tomorrow directed by Amjad Khan, in which her father also starred, but the film did not get a theatrical release.

Sara then worked on Kannan Iyer's supernatural Hindi film Ek Thi Daayan (2013) produced by Ekta Kapoor and portrayed the role of Misha, the little sister of the film's lead character. The film opened to positive reviews but did not perform well commercially, with Sara's performance being described as "irresistibly cute" by the reviewer from Rediff. She then featured in a lead role in R. Sundarrajan's Chithirayil Nilachoru, though the film opened with little publicity and garnered negative reviews. Sara then worked on Vijay's Saivam, a family drama, in which she played a lead character of a young girl named Thamizhselvi. Featuring in an ensemble cast, she won rave reviews for her performance with a critic noting "the film wouldn't be half the film without the abundant charm and screen presence of Sara who plays Tamil".

Personal life
Sara's father Raj Arjun is  an actor and has appeared in several Hindi language films like  Secret Superstar, Thalaivii ,
 Dear Comrade,
Watchman

Filmography

Films

Short films

Awards and nominations

References

External links 

Living people
Indian film actresses
21st-century Indian child actresses
Child actresses in Tamil cinema
21st-century Indian actresses
Actresses from Mumbai
Child actresses in Hindi cinema
Child actresses in Telugu cinema
Child actresses in Malayalam cinema
2000s births